Trioctylmethylammonium bis(trifluoromethylsulfonyl)imide is an ionic liquid that is produced by Solvent Innovation, now part of EMD Chemicals.

References

Ionic liquids
Trifluoromethyl compounds